Berlin–Ichthyosaur State Park is a public recreation area and historic preserve that protects undisturbed ichthyosaur fossils and the ghost town of Berlin in far northwestern Nye County, Nevada. The park has Bortle scale class 1 skies which makes the state park a great place for astronomy as it is far away from light pollution.

Ghost town
The town of Berlin sprang up in 1896, when substantial gold veins were discovered nearby. In total, the Berlin Mine produced 42,000 troy ounces (46,080 oz; 1,306.346 kg) of gold, all removed from tunnels by hard rock mining techniques. The mine became unprofitable by 1911, and the town of Berlin became uninhabited shortly thereafter.

Today, the ore mill still stands, and the stamps and mercury float tables can be viewed. Other buildings still standing include homes, blacksmith shop, stage coach shop and stable, machine shop, and assay office. Some buildings are open to enter, while others offer interior views of their contents through the windows. There are also headworks on some of the mine shafts.

Fossils

Ichthyosaur fossils of the species Shonisaurus popularis were first discovered in the area in 1928. Excavations were conducted through the 1960s, and the remains of approximately 40 ichthyosaurs were found. Until 2004, these remains included the largest ichthyosaurs ever discovered. Several specimens were left where they were found, and can be viewed by the public. These specimens are protected from the elements by a large barn. The fossils are about a 10-minute drive from the Berlin ghost town. The ichthyosaur fossils were designated a National Natural Landmark in 1973.

Activities and amenities
The park offers camping, picnicking, nature trail, and non–winter-month guided tours of the fossil shelter. Multiple trail signs relate the history of the town of Berlin and the mining camp of Union. Guided mine tours proceed approximately  into a tunnel that connects with the Berlin Mine; all other access to the underground works is prohibited as too dangerous.

References

External links

Berlin-Ichthyosaur State Park Nevada State Parks
Berlin-Ichthyosaur State Park Trail Map Nevada State Parks

 

Fossil museums
National Natural Landmarks in Nevada
Natural history of Nevada
Paleontology in Nevada
Paleontological protected areas in the United States
State parks of Nevada
Protected areas of Nye County, Nevada
Protected areas established in 1957
1957 establishments in Nevada
History of Nye County, Nevada